Mariestad Cathedral (Swedish: Mariestads domkyrka) is a cathedral in Mariestad, Sweden. It belongs to the Diocese of Skara of the Church of Sweden.

History
The building was built between 1593 and 1619. It was dedicated in 1625.
The floorplan is a four-bay aisleless late Gothic church with a hint of transepts.
The unpainted natural stone facades and tower spire were first added in 1905 at a restoration directed by Folke Zettervall.
The Baroque altarpiece and pulpit were made in 1701 by Börje Löfman.  The freestanding limestone altar was added during the restoration of 1958-1959 under the direction of Rolf Bergh (1919-2005). In 1938, Frobenius Orgelbyggeri built a new pneumatic organ with partially recycled pipe material.

Gallery

References

External links
Mariestads domkyrka website

Lutheran cathedrals in Sweden
Churches in Västra Götaland County
17th-century Church of Sweden church buildings
Churches in the Diocese of Skara